Pairoj Jaisingha (15 September 1943 – 22 February 2021) was a Thai actor.

Biography
While teaching, he would give performances to make extra money and made his film debut in 1971 alongside Sangthong Seesai. During the 1970s, he made numerous appearances in films, easily sustaining himself enough to quit his job as a teacher. In 1999, he became the primary presenter for Boon Rawd Brewery television advertisements. The ad was seen as humorous thanks to the similarity between the brand's Singha beer and his last name.

Jaisingha was married to Sotiros Nok, with whom he had nine children, one of whom, Krisada, is an indie music singer.

On 25 August 2013, Jaisingha was hospitalized from left hemisphere paralysis. He died in Bangkok on 22 February 2021 at the age of 78.

Filmography
Blackbirds at Bangpleng (1994)
Teng Nong kon maha hia (2007)
Silamanee (2008)
Torranee Ni Nee Krai Krong (2012)

References

1943 births
2021 deaths
Pairoj Jaisingha
Pairoj Jaisingha